Alexandru Ciucurencu (27 September 1903 – 27 December 1977) was a Romanian Post-Impressionist painter, and a corresponding member of the Romanian Academy.

Born in Tulcea, he studied from 1921 to 1926 at the National School of Fine Arts in Bucharest, where he had as teachers George Demetrescu Mirea and Camil Ressu. After making his debut in 1930 at the Official Salon in Bucharest, he worked with a group of artists in Baia Mare, and then went to Paris to pursue his studies at the Académie Julian, where he was a student of André Lhote. In 1948 he became a professor at the School of Fine Arts, and in 1963 he was elected corresponding member of the Romanian Academy.

Ciucurencu was awarded the Order of the Star of the Romanian Socialist Republic — 3rd class in 1959 and 2nd class in 1971.

A collection of Ciucurencu's paintings can be seen in Dr. Frasier Crane's apartment in the sitcom Frasier, in the episode  "The Guilt Trippers" (#9.23, around 11 minutes). A book of his paintings can also be seen on his bookshelf ("First Do No Harm, Season 6, Episode 05; around 20:50s and "The 200th Episode", Season 9, Episode 8, 15minutes and Season 9, Episode 24.)

References

External links

Biography at National Institute for Research and Development in Informatics, Bucharest, Romania 
Profile at artline.ro

1903 births
1977 deaths
People from Tulcea
Bucharest National University of Arts alumni
Académie Julian alumni
20th-century Romanian painters
Academic staff of the Bucharest National University of Arts
Corresponding members of the Romanian Academy
Recipients of the Order of the Star of the Romanian Socialist Republic